Dragan Travica (born 28 August 1986) is an Italian volleyball player, former member of the Italy men's national volleyball team. On club level he plays for Olympiacos Piraeus, bronze medalist at the 2012 Olympic Games, silver medalist at the European Championship (2011, 2013), bronze medalist of the World League (2013, 2014) and Italian Champion (2012).

Personal life
He was born in Zagreb, Croatia, the son of Serbian volleyball player and coach Ljubomir Travica. His sister is the wife of another Italian volleyball player Cristian Savani.

Career
He started his career with Sisley Treviso's youth team and, after one year with Sira Cucine Falconara, he debuted in the Serie A1 (Italy's top division) in 2004 with Kerakoll Modena. In 2005-2006 he played in the Serie A2 at Crema, obtaining the promotion to Serie A1 and winning the award as best Under-23 player in the category. The following year he again played in A2 in Milan, again obtaining the promotion and the A2 Italian Cup.

Travica debuted for Italy national team in 2007 at Forlì. He later played for Modena again and then for Monza, while in 2011-2013 he was a player of Lube Banca Macerata. Then he played for Russian club Belogorie Belgorod.

Sporting achievements
 CEV Champions League
  2013/2014 – with Belogorie Belgorod
 Men's Club World Championship
  2014 – with Belogorie Belgorod
CEV Challenge Cup
  2022/2023 – with Olympiacos Piraeus
 National championships
 2011/2012  Italian Championship, with Lube Banca Macerata
 2014/2015  Russian Championship, with Belogorie Belgorod
 2015/2016  Turkish Championship, with Halkbank Ankara
 2020/2021  Italian Championship, with Sir Safety Umbria
 2021/2022  Italian Championship, with Sir Safety Umbria
 National cups
 2012  Italian SuperCup, with Lube Banca Macerata
 2013  Russian SuperCup, with Belogorie Belgorod
 2014  Russian SuperCup, with Belogorie Belgorod
 2015  Turkish SuperCup, with Halkbank Ankara
 2020  Italian SuperCup, with Sir Safety Umbria
 2022  Italian Cup, with Sir Safety Umbria
 National team
 2011  CEV European Championship
 2012  Olympic Games
 2013  FIVB World League
 2013  CEV European Championship
 2014  FIVB World League

Individual awards
 2011: CEV European Championship - Best Setter
 2023: CEV Challenge Cup – Most Valuable Player

External links
 LegaVolley player profile

References

1986 births
Living people
Sportspeople from Zagreb
Italian people of Serbian descent
Italian men's volleyball players
Olympic volleyball players of Italy
Volleyball players at the 2012 Summer Olympics
Medalists at the 2012 Summer Olympics
Naturalised citizens of Italy
Olympic bronze medalists for Italy
Olympic medalists in volleyball
Italian Champions of men's volleyball
Italian expatriates in Russia
Expatriate volleyball players in Russia
Olympiacos S.C. players
Italian expatriate sportspeople in Turkey
Expatriate volleyball players in Turkey
Serb diaspora sportspeople
Serbs of Croatia